Anthony Smith (May 14, 1884 – February 27, 1964) was an American professional baseball shortstop. He played in Major League Baseball from 1907 through 1911 for the Washington Senators and Brooklyn Superbas / Dodgers.

External links

1884 births
1965 deaths
Major League Baseball shortstops
Brooklyn Superbas players
Brooklyn Dodgers players
Washington Senators (1901–1960) players
Baseball players from Illinois
Minor league baseball managers
Roanoke Tigers players
Minneapolis Millers (baseball) players
Sioux City Packers players
Mobile Sea Gulls players
Toronto Maple Leafs (International League) players
Galveston Pirates players
Lincoln Tigers players
Lincoln Links players
Sioux City Indians players